is the capital city of Iwate Prefecture located in the Tōhoku region of northern Japan.

Geography
The Kitakami River is the second largest river on the Pacific side of Japan (after the Tone River) and the longest in the Tōhoku region. It runs through the city from north to south and has a number of dams within the city boundaries, including the Shijūshida Dam and Gandō Dam. An active volcano, Mount Iwate, dominates the view to the northwest of the city. Mount Himekami is to the north and Mount Hayachine can sometimes be seen to the southeast.

Surrounding municipalities
Iwate Prefecture
Hanamaki
Hachimantai
Takizawa
Miyako
Shizukuishi
Kuzumaki
Shiwa
Yahaba
Iwaizumi

Demographics
Per Japanese census data, the population of Morioka peaked at around the year 2000 and has slightly declined since.

Climate 
Morioka has a cold, humid continental climate (Köppen Dfa) characterized by warm, short summers and long, cold winters with heavy snowfall.

History 

The area of present-day Morioka has been continuously inhabited since the Japanese Paleolithic period. Numerous Jōmon, Yayoi and Kofun period tombs and remains have been found. The Emishi inhabited the area into the Heian period. During the Enryaku era of the Heian period, Sakanoue no Tamuramaro, was ordered north to Shiwa Castle in 803 AD, as a military center to extend the domination of the Yamato dynasty over Mutsu Province. The area was later ruled by the Abe clan until their destruction during the Former Nine Years War at the hands of the Minamoto and Kiyohara clans. The Kiyohara were in turn defeated in the Gosannen War and the area came under the control of the Ōshū Fujiwara Clan based in Hiraizumi, to the south of Morioka. After the Ōshū Fujiwara were destroyed by Minamoto no Yoritomo at the start of the Kamakura period, the area was disputed by several samurai clans until the Nanbu clan, based in Sannohe to the north, expanded their territory during the Sengoku period and built Kozukata Castle in 1592.

Following the Battle of Sekigahara and the formal recognition of Morioka Domain under the Tokugawa shogunate, Kozukata Castle was renamed Morioka Castle.

After the start of the Meiji period, the former Morioka Domain became Morioka Prefecture in 1870, and part of Iwate Prefecture from 1872. With the establishment of the modern municipality system on April 1, 1889, the city of Morioka was established as the capital of Iwate Prefecture. The city was connected by train to Tokyo in 1890. The city emerged from World War II with very little damage, having been subject to only two minor air raids during the war.

On January 10, 2006, the village of Tamayama was merged into Morioka. Morioka was proclaimed a core city in 2008, with increased local autonomy.

During the 2011 Tōhoku earthquake, Morioka was hit by a 6.1 earthquake, and numerous aftershocks, but with little damage other than extensive power outages.

Government

Morioka has a mayor-council form of government with a directly elected mayor and a unicameral city legislature of 38 members. Morioka contributes ten seats to the Iwate Prefectural legislature. In terms of national politics, the town is part of Iwate first district of the lower house of the Diet of Japan.

Education

Colleges and university
Iwate University
Iwate Medical University

High schools
Morioka has eight public high schools operated by the Iwate Prefectural Board of Education. 
 Morioka First High School
 Morioka Second High School
 Morioka Third High School
 Morioka Fourth High School
 Morioka South High School
 Morioka Agricultural High School
 Morioka Industrial High School
 Morioka Commercial High School
There is also one public high school operated by the city government and ten private high schools

Transportation

Railway
 East Japan Railway Company (JR East) -  Tōhoku Shinkansen
Morioka Station 
 East Japan Railway Company (JR East) -  Tōhoku Main Line
 -  - Morioka 
 East Japan Railway Company (JR East) -  Tazawako Line (Akita Shinkansen)
Morioka - Maegata
 East Japan Railway Company (JR East) -  Yamada Line
Morioka -  -  - 
 East Japan Railway Company (JR East) -  Hanawa Line
Morioka -  
 Iwate Ginga Railway Line
Morioka –  –  –  –

Highway
 – Morioka-Minami IC, Morioka IC

Local attractions
 The Iwate Museum of Art in Morioka displays works by three notable local artists, Tetsugoro Yorozu, Shunsuke Matsumoto and Yasutake Funakoshi, as well as holding exhibitions on national and international themes.
Rock-Breaking Cherry Tree - designated a natural monument of Japan.
Iwate Prefectural Museum
Site of Morioka Castle, National Historic Site
Shiwa Castle ruins, National Historic Site
Bank of Iwate Red Brick Building, Important Cultural Property
Morioka Hachimangū

Sports

Sports venues
Iwate Morioka Stadium
Morioka Racecourse
Morioka Takaya Arena

Sports teams
Iwate Grulla Morioka, football team
Iwate Big Bulls, basketball team

Religion

Temples and shrines 

Hōon-ji is a Sōtō Zen Buddhist temple which was originally built at Sannohe by the 13th lord of the Nambu clan, Nambu Moriyuki, in 1394, and brought to Morioka by the 27th lord, Nambu Toshinao. It was considered the head temple among the 280 operated by the Nambu clan. A notable feature is the Rakan-dō, built in 1735 and rebuilt in 1858. Its central statue Rushana butsu is reported to be made by Kōbō-daishi. Within the Rakan-dō are statues of the 500 Rakan,  which were made in Kyoto and later brought to Morioka. Included are representations of Kublai Khan and Marco Polo. It is an active Zen training temple for monks.
 Mitsuishi Jinja is a Shinto shrine which has three large rocks on the grounds with shackles around them to represent the story of 'Oni no tegata', which is a legend explaining the origin of the name of Iwate prefecture. According to the legend, there was once an Oni or demon who often tormented and harassed the local people. When the people prayed to the spirit of Mitsuishi for protection, the demon was immediately shackled to the rocks and made to promise never to trouble the people again. As a sign of this promise, the demon left a handprint on one of the rocks, thus giving rise to the name Iwate, literally meaning "rock hand".
Morioka Hachiman Shrine
 Sakurayama is a Shinto shrine 20 feet above (6 meters) featuring a massive rock.

Cuisine 
Morioka attracts tourists with local noodles such as jajamen, reimen, and wanko soba. Brewing is also a thriving industry of the city. Nambu Senbei, a type of rice cracker, is considered a local specialty.

Media
Iwate Asahi Television
Iwate Broadcasting Company
Iwate Menkoi Television
Iwate Nippo
Television Iwate

International relations
  Victoria, British Columbia, Canada  (sister city since 1985)

Notable persons 

Hara Takashi, former Prime Minister of Japan
Takuboku Ishikawa, poet
Takuya Kawamura, professional basketball player
Yusei Kikuchi, professional baseball player
Yōko Mihara, actress
Milano Collection A.T., professional wrestler
Taka Michinoku, professional wrestler
The Great Sasuke, professional wrestler
Inazō Nitobe, author, educator, diplomat, and politician during the Meiji period and Taishō period
Mitsuo Ogasawara, footballer
Takatō Ōshima, engineer - made the first Western-style cannon in Japan
Mikoi Sasaki, actress
Mitsumasa Yonai, former Prime Minister of Japan
Nishikigi Tetsuya, sumo wrestler

References

External links

 
 Official Website 

 
Cities in Iwate Prefecture